The year 1916 in film involved some significant events.



Events
 Charlie Chaplin signs for Mutual Film for a salary of $10,000 a week and a signing on fee of $150,000, making him one of the highest-paid people in the United States.
 June 24 – Mary Pickford signs a contract for $10,000 a week plus profit participation, guaranteeing her over $1 million per year.
 July 19 – Famous Players-Lasky is formed through a merger of Adolph Zukor's Famous Players Film Company and Jesse L. Lasky's Feature Play Company.  Later in the year, they acquire distributor Paramount Pictures.
 August 10 – The official British documentary propaganda film The Battle of the Somme is premièred in London. In the first six weeks of general release (from 20 August) 20 million people view it.
 September 5 – Release of D. W. Griffith's epic film Intolerance: Love's Struggle Through the Ages, starring Lillian Gish (as "The Eternal Motherhood") and Constance Talmadge (in two roles), in the United States. It is estimated to have cost around $2.5 million to make but is initially a commercial failure.
 October 17 – Release of A Daughter of the Gods, the first US production with a million dollar budget, with the first nude scene by a major star (Annette Kellerman).
 November 19 – Samuel Goldfish (later renamed Samuel Goldwyn) and Edgar Selwyn establish Goldwyn Pictures, later to become one of the most successful independent filmmakers.
 The Society of Motion Picture and Television Engineers is founded in the United States as the Society of Motion Picture Engineers.
 11 mm, an amateur film gauge, appears on the market.

Top-grossing films (U.S.)

Notable films released in 1916

20,000 Leagues Under the Sea Directed by Stuart Paton
The Adventures of Peg o' the Ring Directed by Francis Ford
The Americano Directed by John Emerson
Arima no neko sodo (Japanese) starring Matsunosuke Onoe, another film adaptation of the Japanese legend of the "Ghost Cat of Arima"
Bake ginnan (Japanese) directed by Shozo Makino for Nikkatsu, starring Matsunosuke Onoe; a film adaptation of the Japanese legend of the "Monster Gingko TreeThe Battle of the Somme – (GB)Behind the Screen, directed by Charlie Chaplin, starring Chaplin and Edna PurvianceThe Black Crook, directed by Robert Vignola, starring Edward P. Sullivan; based on a play by Charles M. Barras, this "Faust"-like film was one of the earliest film musicals with choreographed dance numbersThe Bogus Ghost, an 11-minute comedydirected by Harry F. Millarde for Kalem FilmsLa Bohème, by Albert CapellaniCenere, starring Eleonora Duse (the only film in which she appears) – (Italy)Civilization, directed by Reginald Barker and Thomas H. Ince, starring Howard C. Hickman and Enid MarkeyThe Count, directed by Charlie Chaplin, starring Chaplin and Edna PurvianceCrime and the Penalty (British) directed by R. Harley West, this film's plot was a cross between Murders in the Rue Morgue and Trilby, featuring a gorilla trained to strange peopleThe Crimson Stain Mystery (British) 16-chapter science-fiction serial directed by T. Hayes Hunter;  a near-complete print exists in the Library of CongressThe Curse of Quon GwonThe Danger Girl, starring Gloria Swanson and Bobby VernonA Daughter of the Gods, a 3-hour long movie directed by Herbert Brenon and starring Annette Kellerman; this was the United States' first million-dollar film productionThe Dead Alive, directed by Henry J. Vernot, starring Marguerite CourtotA Dead With the Devil (British) short Faustian film directed by Frank Wilson, produced by Cecil M. HepworthThe Devil's Bondwoman, directed by Lloyd B. Carleton for Universal Pictures, starring Dorothy Davenport and Emory JohnsonThe Devil's Toy, directed by Harley Knoles, based on an Edward Madden poem "The Mill of the Gods", starring Adele Blood and Montagu LoveDisraeli, directed by Charles Calvert and Percy Nash – (GB)Doktor Satansohn (German) directed by Edmund Edel, starring Ernst LubitschEast Is East, starring Florence Turner – (GB)Farmer Al Falfa's Cat-Tastrophe, animation produced by Paul TerryFatty and Mabel Adrift, directed by and starring Roscoe "Fatty" ArbuckleFeathertop, directed by Henry J. Vernot, starring Mathilde Baring, John Reinhard and Marguerite Courtot; loosely based on the story by Nathaniel HawthorneThe Floorwalker, directed by and starring Charles ChaplinFrau Eva, directed by Robert Wiene and starring Emil Jannings (Germany)The Grasping Hand (French) 13-minute ghost film directed by Max Linder who also starred in itThe Green-Eyed Monster, directed by J. Gordon Edwards, starring Robert B. Mantell and Stuart HolmesHabit of Happiness, starring Douglas FairbanksHaunted, a haunted cabin film starring Lillian Leighton and Ralph McComasThe Haunted Bell, directed by Henry Otto, starring King Baggot, based on a short story by Jacques FutrelleHaunts for Rent, directed by C. Allan Gilbert, this film featured mixed live action with animated effectsHell's Hinges, directed by Charles Swickard and William S. Hart, starring William S. HartHer Father's Gold (aka The Water Devil) directed by Eugene Moore for Thanhouser Films, based on a story by Crittenden MarriottHomunculus (German) 6-chapter serial about a scientist who creates an artificial human, directed by Otto Rippert, starring Olaf Foenss as the Monster; plot similar to Frankenstein, Alraune and The GolemHoodoo Ann, starring Mae Marsh and Robert HarronHulda from Holland, starring Mary Pickford

 Intolerance, directed by D.W. Griffith, starring Lillian Gish and Constance TalmadgeJoan the Woman, directed by Cecil B. DeMille, starring Geraldine FarrarJudex, directed by Louis Feuillade, starring Musidora and René Cresté – (France)Lights of New York, directed by Van Dyke Brooke, starring Leah Baird and Walter McGrailLuke's Double (French) 11-minute comedy short based on Dr. Jekyll and Mr. Hyde, starring Harold Lloyd, directed by Hal RoachThe Lyons Mail, directed by Fred Paul – (Britain)Man Without a Soul (British) directed by George Loane Tucker, starring Barbara Everest and Milton RosmerA Maori Maid's Love, directed by Raymond Longford – (Australia/New Zealand)Mingling Spirits, short film directed by Al Christie for Universal Pictures, starring Betty CompsonMr. Tvardovski (Russian) a Faustian-type film directed by Ladislas Starevitch, starring Nicolai Saltykov, based on a novel by J. I. Kraszevski; part of the film featured animationThe Mutiny of the Bounty, directed by Raymond Longford – (Australia/New Zealand)The Mysteries of Myra, 15-chapter serial directed by Theodore and Leopold Wharton, starring Jean Sothern, Howard Estabrook and Warner OlandThe Mystery of the Leaping Fish, short directed by John Emerson, starring Douglas FairbanksNight of Horror/ Nachte des Grauens (German) a lost film directed by Richard Oswald and Arthur Robison, starring Emil Jannings and Werner Krauss, cited in some references as being the first vampire film Oliver Twist, starring Marie DoroOne A.M., directed by and starring Charlie ChaplinThe Pawnshop, a Charles Chaplin shortThe Phantom of the Opera (German) first film version of the Gaston Leroux novel, directed by Ernst Matray, starring Nils Olaf Chrisander and Aud Egede NissenThe Phantom Witness, directed by Frederick Sullivan for Thanhouser Films, starring Kathryn Adams and Edwin StanleyThe Picture of Dorian Gray (British) directed by Fred W. Durant, starring Henry Victor and Pat O'MalleyPolice, a Charles Chaplin short with Edna Purviance and Wesley RugglesThe Queen of Spades/ Pikovaya dama (Russian) directed by Yakov Protazanov, based on the short story by Alexander Pushkin, starring Tamara Duvan and Nikolai PanovThe Real Thing at Last (British) directed by James m. Barrie and L.C. MacBean, starring Ernest ThesigerThe Return of Draw Egan, directed by and starring William S. HartThe Rink, a Charles Chaplin shortThe Romantic Journey, directed by George Fitzmaurice, written by Ouida Bergere, starring William CourtenaySaint, Devil and Woman, directed by Frederick Sullivan for Thanhouser Films, starring Florence La Badie Sally Bishop directed by George Pearson – (GB)Sally in Our Alley directed by Larry Trimble, starring Hilda Trevelyan, Mary Dibley, Reginald Owen – (GB)Seven Keys to Baldpate (Australian) directed by Monte Luke, starring Dorothy Brunton and J. Plumpton Wilson; based on the 1913 novel by Earl Derr Biggers which was turned into a play by George M. CohanShe (British) directed by Horace Lisle Lucoque and William G.B. Barker, starring Alice Delysia and Henry Victor; the first British film adaptation of the H. Rider Haggard novelSherlock Holmes (U.S.), directed by Arthur Berthelet, starring William Gillette as Holmes, based on the 1899 stage play which also starred William Gillette (Ernest Maupain played Moriarty)The Shielding Shadow (aka Ravengar) 15-chapter serial directed by Louis Gasnier (who later directed Reefer Madness in 1936) and Donald MacKenzie, starring Grace Darmond and Ralph KellardThe Silent Stranger (aka The Silent Man) 11-minute short starring, and directed by, King BaggotSnow White, starring Marguerite ClarkSold to Satan, starring and directed by Edward SlomanThe Soul's Cycle, directed by Ulysses Davis, starring Margaret Gibson and John Oaker, deals with reincarnation similar in plot to The Mummy (1932)Trilby Frilled, 10-minute short directed by Edwin McKim, starring Davy Don as Svengali and Patsy De Forest; spoof of George Du Maurier's 1894 novel Trilby20,000 Leagues Under the Sea (1916 film), directed by Stuart Paton for Universal Pictures, starring Curtis Benton and Alan Holubar (as Capt. Nemo), based on the novel by Jules VerneUnder Two Flags, starring Theda BaraUltus, the Man From the Dead (British) directed by George Pearson for Gaumont Films, starring Aurele Sydney as Ultus, a superhero apparently influenced by France's popular film character Fantomas; there were four Ultus films in the series, which were later re-edited into seven shorter films for overseas distributionUltus and the Grey Lady (British) 2nd film in the "Ultus" series, directed by George Pearson, starring Aurele Sydney as UltusUltus and the Secret of the Night (British) 3rd film in the "Ultus" series, directed by George Pearson, again starring Aurele Sydney as UltusUltus and the Three-Button Mystery (British) 4th and final film in the "Ultus" series, directed by George Pearson, starring Aurele Sydney as Ultus; this 4th film wasn't theatrically released until 1917The Vagabond, directed by and starring Charlie ChaplinThe Valley of Fear (British) directed by Alexander Butler, based on the novel by Arthur Conan Doyle, starring H.A. Saintsbury as Sherlock Holmes and Arthur M. Cullin as Dr. Watson (Booth Conway played Moriarty)The Vij (Russian) written and directed by Wadyslaw Starewicz, starring Ivan Mosjoukine and Olga Obolenskaya; the 2nd ever film adaptation of Nicolai Gogol's short story; featured stop motion animationA Welsh Singer directed by Henry Edwards, starring Edwards, Florence Turner and Campbell Gullan – (GB)The Wheel of Death (British) directed by A.E. Coleby, starring Arthur Rooke and Joan LeggeWhere Are My Children?, directed by Phillips Smalley and Lois Weber, starring Tyrone Power, Sr. and Juan de la CruzWillard-Johnson Boxing MatchWitchcraft, directed by Frank Reicher, produced by Jesse L. Lasky, starring Fannie Ward and Jack Dean, based on a short story by Robert Ralston ReedThe Witching Hour, directed by George Irving, starring C. Aubrey Smith and Marie Shotwell; this was adapted from the 1907 stage play by Augustus ThomasThe Witch of the Mountains, starring Mareguerite Nichols, Gordon Sackville and Richard Johnson; produced by Knickerbocker Star FeaturesThe Fable of the Small Town Favorite Who Was Ruined by Too Much Competition, comedy short film

Short film seriesBroncho Billy Anderson (1910–1916)Harold Lloyd (1913–1921)Charlie Chaplin (1914–1923)

Births
January 3
Maxene Andrews, singer, actress, member of Andrews Sisters (died 1995)
Betty Furness, actress, consumer activist (died 1994)
January 4 – Lionel Newman, composer (died 1989)
February 1 - Bruce Gordon, actor (died 2011)
February 13 – James Griffith, actor, musician, screenwriter (died 1993)
February 14
Sally Gray, born Constance Stevens, actress (died 2006)
Masaki Kobayashi, director (died 1996)
February 17 - Raf Vallone, Italian actor (died 2002)
February 26 – Jackie Gleason, actor (died 1987)
February 29 – Dinah Shore, singer, actress, television presenter (died 1994)
March 6 – Rochelle Hudson, actress (died 1972)
March 16 – Mercedes McCambridge, actress (died 2004)
March 21 - Vittorio Duse, Italian actor, screenwriter and director (died 2005)
March 24
Anna Maria Bottini, actress (died 2020)
Richard Conte, American actor (died 1975)
March 25 – Jean Rogers, actress (died 1991)
March 26 – Sterling Hayden, actor (died 1986)
March 29 - Sam Beazley, British actor (died 2017)
April 4 – David White, actor (died 1990)
April 5 – Gregory Peck, actor (died 2003)
April 26 – Vic Perrin, voice actor (died 1989)
April 30 – Phil Brown, actor (died 2006)
May 1 – Glenn Ford, actor (died 2006)
May 6 – Adriana Caselotti, singer, voice actress (died 1997)
June 12 – Irwin Allen, director, producer (died 1991)
June 14 – Dorothy McGuire, actress (died 2001)
June 19 – Karin Booth, actress (died 2003)
June 21 – Dorothea Kent, actress (died 1990)
June 23 – Irene Worth, actress (died 2002)
June 29 – Ruth Warrick, singer, actress, political activist (died 2005)
July 1 – Olivia de Havilland, actress (died 2020)
July 4 – Burton Zucker, actor, real estate developer, father of David and Jerry Zucker (d. 2008)
July 27 – Keenan Wynn, actor (died 1986)
August 18 - Don Keefer, American actor (died 2014)
August 19 - Marie Wilson, American actress (died 1972)
August 21 - Geoffrey Keen, English actor (died 2005)
August 25 – Van Johnson, actor (died 2008)
August 27
George Montgomery, actor (died 2000)
Martha Raye, actress (died 1994)
September 1 – Arleen Whelan, actress (died 1993)
September 13 - Lynne Carver, American actress (died 1955)
September 15 – Margaret Lockwood, actress (died 1990)
September 18 – Rossano Brazzi, actor (died 1994)
September 28 – Peter Finch, actor (died 1977)
October 4 – Robin Raymond, actress (died 1994)
November 20 – Evelyn Keyes, actress (died 2008)
November 23 - Michael Gough, British character actor (died 2011)
December 5 – Margaret Hayes, actress (died 1977)
December 9 – Kirk Douglas, actor (died 2020)
December 13 – Mark Stevens, actor (died 1994)
December 18 – Betty Grable, actress (died 1973)
December 19 – Roy Baker, director (died 2010)

Deaths
January 17, Arthur V. Johnson, 39, American screen actor and director, The Sealed Room, The Unchanging Sea, The Adventures of Dollie, The Voice of the Violin, tuberculosis
 June 22 
Page Peters, 26, American screen actor, The Warrens of Virginia, The Purple Scar, An International Marriage, Davy Crockett, Pasquale, drowned swimming
Maurice Vinot, 27, French screen actor, airplane crash
 September 9 – Sydney Ayres, 37, American stage & screen actor and director, The Sting of Conscience, The Avenger, As in a Dream, multiple sclerosis
 September 17 – Arthur Hoops, 45, American stage & screen actor, The Secret of Eve, Bridges Burned, Extravagance, The Eternal Question, The Scarlet Woman, heart attack
 September 27 – Camille D'Arcy, 37, American actress, The Prince Chap, Captain Jinks of the Horse Marines, A Daughter of the City, The White Sister, The Pacifist, infection from bathing
 October 6 – Henry Woodruff, 47, American stage & screen actor, A Beckoning Flame, A Man and His Mate, Bright's disease
 November 30 – Dorrit Weixler, 23, German comic actress, Maria, Kammermusik, Heimgekehrt, Todesrauchen, suicide by hanging
 unknown – Jean, the Vitagraph Dog (born 1902), American Border Collie, Jean and the Calico Doll, Fraid CatDebuts
 Richard Barthelmess – Gloria's Romance (uncredited) 
 Constance Bennett – The Valley of Decision Billie Burke – Peggy Ann Dvorak – Ramona Edmund Gwenn – The Real Thing at Last Hedda Hopper – The Battle of Hearts (as Elda Furry)
 Colleen Moore – The Prince of Graustark (uncredited)
 Mae Murray – To Have and to Hold Alla Nazimova – War Brides Ramon Novarro – Joan the Woman Edward G. Robinson – Arms and the Woman Conrad Veidt – Der Weg des Todes''

References

 
Film by year